Lingdong may refer to:

Lingdong District, in Shuangyashan, Heilongjiang, China
Lingdong, North Sikkim, Sikkim, India
Yeongdong, region in Korea 
 Beijing Hyundai Elantra Lingdong, Chinese(Beijing　Hyundai) spec of 6th Generation Elantra.